Sewa Bay, or Duau Pwata, is a dialectically diverse Austronesian language spoken in the D'Entrecasteaux Islands of Papua New Guinea. Its dialects are Miadeba, Bwakera, Maiabare, Darubia, Sewataitai, Sibonai and Central Sewa Bay. It is spoken in Milne Bay province: center of Normanby island, Sewa Bay area.

References 

Nuclear Papuan Tip languages
Languages of Milne Bay Province
D'Entrecasteaux Islands